Hacienda San Diego Cutz is a private event venue in the Conkal Municipality in Yucatán, Mexico.

Toponym 
The name (San Diego Cutz) refers to Didacus of Alcalá and Cutz means Wild turkey (Meleagris gallopavo) in the Mayan language.

Historical importance 
It had its splendor during the time of the henequen boom and issued hacienda tokens which, due to their design, are of interest to numismatists. These records certify the farm as property of J. Ancona and sons in 1874.

Historical facts  
 In 1995 it changes its name from San José Kuché to San Diego Cutz, to distinguish it from the hacienda of similar name in Mérida Municipality.

In popular culture 
This hacienda is best known for her role in the Televisa telenovela Abismo de pasión. where is the official residence of the Arango family and where Damían Arango (David Zepeda) and Alfonsina Mondragón (Blanca Guerra) live.

Demographics 
According to the 2005 INEGI census, the population of the town was 0 inhabitants.

Gallery

References

External links 
 
Populated places established in 1874 
1874 establishments in Mexico 
San Diego Cutz
Agave production